Boris Stepanovich Zhitkov (— 19 October 1938) was a writer from the Russian Empire and later the Soviet Union, mainly known as the author of children's books and the novel Viktor Vavich about the 1905 Russian Revolution.

Biography 

Zhitkov was born in Novgorod; his father worked as a mathematics teacher and his mother was a pianist. His works include numerous books in which he, in a figurative form, described various professions. His books are based on his rich experience as a sailor and then ship captain, scientist, traveler and explorer. He also worked as a navigator, an ichthyologist, a metal worker, a shipbuilding engineer, a teacher of physics and drafting, and a technical college headmaster. Zhitkov personally participated in the 1905 Russian Revolution.

In 1924 Zhitkov started to be published and soon became a professional writer. He is best known for the children's travel book What I Saw about the summer vacation adventures of a curious little boy nicknamed Pochemuchka (Russian: Почемучка, a new word coined by Zhitkov from Почему, meaning Why?). Zhitkov was a close friend of Korney Chukovsky, who wrote in his diary entry for 28 December 1931:Zhitkov is all upset about the self-flagellation going on among critics at the Writers' Union. He says that at the meeting where Eikhenbaum was asked to practice self-criticism, Eikhenbaum responded, "Self-criticism should be practiced before one writes, not after." [...] Zhitkov's interpretation of the now famous meeting runs as follows: "We're all just so many sons of bitches, so let's pull down our pants and let ourselves be whipped." Zhitkov's historical novel about the 1905 Revolution, Viktor Vavich, published posthumously in 1941, was immediately destroyed and republished in 1999 only thanks to Lydia Chukovskaya having saved a copy; Boris Pasternak called it "the best thing that has ever been written about 1905; it's a shame that nobody knows this book."

Zhitkov also featured as a character in Samuil Marshak's children's poem "Post" from 1927. The poem was adapted for screen in a 1964 animated film, where Zhitkov was voiced by actor Erast Garin.

On July 10, 1939, Pravda, the newspaper of the Communist Party, ran a feature on him in which his book What I saw was very much praised.

Publications

Zhitkov B. Angry Sea. — 1924 
Zhitkov B. Sea Stories. — 1925 
Zhitkov B. Black Sails. — 1927 
Zhitkov B. Heads or Tails. — 1928 
Zhitkov B. Locomotives. — 1928 
Zhitkov B. Boa Constrictor. — 1928 
Zhitkov B. Stone Seal. — 1931 
Zhitkov B. Sea Stories. — 1931 
Zhitkov B. Sea Short Stories. — 1935 
Zhitkov B. Short Stories about Animals. — 1935 
Zhitkov B. Sea Stories. — 1937 
Zhitkov B. What I Saw. — 1939 
Zhitkov B. Short Stories. — 1940 
Zhitkov B. Short Stories about Animals. — 1940 
Zhitkov B. Viktor Vavich. — 1941 
Zhitkov B. Short Stories about Technology. — 1942 
Zhitkov B. Red Commander. — 1956 — (My First Books). 
Zhitkov B. How I Hunted the Little Fellows / Illustrations by Paul O. Zelinsky. - 1979 
Zhitkov B. About an Elephant: Short Stories / Illustrations by N. Petrova. — 1980 
Zhitkov B. Seven Fires: Sketches, Short Stories, Narrative, Plays — 1982 
Zhitkov B. Selected Works (Introductory article by K. I. Chukovsky). — 1988 
Zhitkov B. Selected works (Composition, introductory article and notes by V. Glotser). — 1989 
Zhitkov B. Short Stories about Animals. — 1989 
Zhitkov B. Short Stories for Children. — 1998 
Zhitkov B. Viktor Vavich. — 1999 
Zhitkov B. How I Used to Catch Little Men: Short Stories. — 2001 
Zhitkov B. Viktor Vavich. — 2007 
Zhitkov B. I Will Mend My Ways!. — 2011 
Zhitkov B. Magazine for Kids "" ("Sparrow").

References

External links
 Biography at Russia-InfoCentre 
 Works by Boris Zhitkov 
  (some under "Zhitkov, Boris Stepanovich", some "from old catalog")

1882 births
1938 deaths
Children's writers from the Russian Empire
Soviet children's writers
Soviet male writers